Miss Rwanda 2012, the third edition of the Miss Rwanda pageant, was held on December 1, 2012 at Gikondo Expo Grounds in Kigali. 

The winner, Aurore Mutesi Kayiranga succeeded Grace Bahati, Miss Rwanda 2009. Grace Bahati was not invited to officially hand over his crown to his successor because she gave birth to a son out of wedlock. It's a taboo is very present in Rwandan culture.

Results

Special Awards 
Miss Congeniality - Ange Uwamahoro (Northern Province)
Miss Photogenic - Fidelis Tega Karangwa (Eastern Province)
Miss Popular - Liliane Mubera Umutesi (Eastern Province) 
Miss Innovation - Joe Christa Giraso (Kigali)

Contestants

Contestant notes 
Carmen Akineza, had finished 1st runner-up of Miss Rwanda 2014.

Crossovers 
Contestants who previously competed or will be competing at international beauty pageants:

Miss FESPAM
2013: Southern Province: Aurore Mutesi Kayiranga (Winner)

Miss Supranational   
2013: Southern Province: Aurore Mutesi Kayiranga

Miss Fashion Beauty Universal 
2014: Southern Province: Carine Utamuliza Rusaro (3rd Runner-up)

References

External links
Official website

2012
2012 in Rwanda
2012 beauty pageants